The  is a Shinto shrine in the city of Uji, Kyoto Prefecture, Japan. The shrine was built as a guardian shrine for the nearby Byōdō-in, and is adjacent to the Uji Shrine. In 1994, it was registered as a UNESCO World Heritage Site as one of the "Historic Monuments of Ancient Kyoto". The honden and haiden have been designated by the Agency for Cultural Affairs as National Treasures in the category shrines.

The Ujigami Shrine is dedicated to the Emperor Ōjin and his sons, the imperial princes Uji no Wakiiratsuko and Emperor Nintoku. Uji no Wakiiratsuko committed suicide to solve a dispute over the imperial succession, and the shrine was built in his honor.

The honden of the Ujigami Shrine is known as the oldest example of nagare-zukuri style of shrine architecture in Japan. In this style of architecture the three inner shrine structures are built side-by-side, with the structure in the middle being larger than those to the left and right. The honden dates to the late Heian period (794 – 1185). The haiden is built in the shinden-zukuri style, and its roof in the sugaruhafu style. The haiden dates to the Kamakura period (1185 – 1333). The Kasuga Shrine, also within the shrine precinct, dates to the same period. The shrine is noted for its freshwater spring.

Ujigami Shrine was found via digital dendrochronology to be the oldest original Shinto shrine in Japan. The Nara Research Institute for Cultural Properties determined that the shrine was built in approximately 1060, which closely matches the written account of the founding of the shrine.

Until the Meiji Period (1868 – 1912) the Uji and Ujigami shrines were collectively known as the Rikyukamisha. The annual festival of the Ujigami Shrine is held on May 5.

See also
Uji Shrine
Ujigami
Historic Monuments of Ancient Kyoto
Byōdō-in

References

Shinto shrines in Kyoto Prefecture
World Heritage Sites in Japan
National Treasures of Japan
Important Cultural Properties of Japan
11th-century Shinto shrines